Shaw High School can refer to:

Shaw High School (Alabama) in Mobile
Shaw High School (Georgia) in Columbus
Shaw High School (Ohio) in East Cleveland
Shaw High School (now McEvans Warriors K-12 School) in Shaw, Mississippi
Archbishop Shaw High School in New Orleans, Louisiana

See also
Shaw Junior High School, listed on the National Register of Historic Places in Washington, D.C.
Shaw (disambiguation)